The 2002 U.S. Men's Clay Court Championships was a men's tennis tournament played on outdoor clay courts at the Westside Tennis Club in Houston, Texas in the United States and was part of the International Series of the 2002 ATP Tour. It was the 24th edition of the tournament and ran from April 22 through April 28, 2002. Third-seeded Andy Roddick won his second consecutive singles title at the event.

Finals

Singles

 Andy Roddick defeated  Pete Sampras 7–6(11–9), 6–3
 It was Roddick's 3rd title of the year and the 7th of his career.

Doubles

 Mardy Fish /  Andy Roddick defeated  Jan-Michael Gambill /  Graydon Oliver 6–4, 6–4
 It was Fish's only title of the year and the 1st of his career. It was Roddick's 2nd title of the year and the 6th of his career.

References

External links
 Official website
 ATP tournament profile

 
U.S. Men's Clay Court Championships
U.S. Men's Clay Court Championships
U.S. Men's Clay Court Championships
U.S. Men's Clay Court Championships
U.S. Men's Clay Court Championships